The William Prager Medal is an award given annually by the Society of Engineering Science (SES) to an individual for "outstanding research contributions in either theoretical or experimental Solid Mechanics or both".  This medal was established in 1983.  The actual award is a medal with William Prager's likeness on one side and an honorarium of USD 2000.

William Prager Medal recipients 
 1983 –	Daniel C. Drucker
 1986 –	Rodney J. Clifton
 1988 –	James R. Rice
 1989 –	Richard M. Christensen
 1991 –	John W. Hutchinson
 1994 –	George J. Dvorak
 1996 –	Zdenek P. Bazant
 1998 –	John R. Willis
 1999 –	Kenneth L. Johnson
 2000 –	L. Ben Freund
 2001 –	Jan D. Achenbach
 2002 –	Siavouche Nemat-Nasser
 2004 –	Salvatore Torquato
 2006 –	Alan Needleman
 2007 –	Graeme Walter Milton, University of Utah, Expertise: Composites, Metamaterials
 2008 –	Richard D. James, University of Minnesota, Expertise: Quasicontinuum theory, Ferroelectric materials, Phase transformations
 2009 –	Alan Wineman, University of Michigan Ann Arbor, Expertise: Viscoelasticity, Polymers
 2010 –	Raymond W. Ogden, University of Glasgow, Expertise: Nonlinear elasticity, Elastomers
 2011 –	Ted Belytschko, Northwestern University, Expertise: Computational mechanics, Finite element method
 2012 –	Zhigang Suo, Harvard University, Expertise: Fracture mechanics, Electroactive polymers
 2013 –	George J. Weng, Rutgers University, Expertise: Micromechanics, Composites, Phase field models, Nanocomposites
 2014 –	Robert M. McMeeking, University of California, Santa Barbara
 2015 –	Huajian Gao, Brown University
 2018 –	Lallit Anand, MIT
 2019 –	Horacio Espinosa, Northwestern University
 2020 –  K. Ravi-Chandar, The University of Texas at Austin
 2021 –	Gerhard A. Holzapfel, Graz University of Technology and Norwegian University of Science and Technology, Expertise: Biomechanics, Constitutive equation, Mechanobiology
 2022 –  Vikram Deshpande,  University of Cambridge Expertise: Micro-architected solids, Plasticity, Mechanobiology

See also

 List of mechanical engineering awards
 Mechanician

Notes

External links 
 [Society of Engineering Science  ]

Mechanical engineering awards
Awards established in 1983